Microtransit is a form of bus demand responsive transport vehicle for hire. This transit service offers a highly flexible routing and/or highly flexible scheduling of minibus vehicles shared with other passengers. Microtransit providers build routes ad-hoc exclusively so as to only match each demand (trip) and supply (driven vehicle) and extend the efficiency and accessibility of the transit service. Possible pick-up/drop-off stops are restricted (usually within a geofenced area), and transit can be provided either as a stop-to-stop service or curb-to-curb service. 
Proponents argue conceptually, microtransit fits somewhere between private individual transportation (cars or taxicabs or ridesharing companies) and public mass transit (bus).

Customers can request new routes based on demand. According to SAE International “Microtransit is a privately or publicly operated, technology-enabled transit service that typically uses multi-passenger/pooled shuttles or vans to provide on-demand or fixed-schedule services with either dynamic or fixed routing”. This mainly target children and teens and customers to connect between residential areas to downtown.

History

Although the share-taxi kind of transit service has been running for a while in Southern hemisphere countries and Asia, these have involved private provision of some degree of fixed routes or fixed schedules and not always booking ability let alone mobile booking or route optimisation. The development of mobile booking technologies has led to a wave of pilot schemes and adoption in Europe and North America.

In USA (Los Angeles and New York), microtransit has evolved from jitney  which although are common in many cities around the world, but disappeared from USA as a result of tight regulations. In 1914 during a streetcar strike in Los Angeles, a motorist began giving rides for a jitney and with its flexible service it swept the nation very quickly. Another jitney success was “dollar vans” in 1980 during the eleven-day public transit strike.

Development
Technologies allow real time exchange of booking information and programmed route optimization of the transit service. The term Microtransit may have emerged into widespread industry discussion around 2015, when this wave of technology-enabled services was starting, and seems specific to the English language.
  
The current implementations result from public-private partnerships (and subsidized by the government) or are brought by the private sector directly to the customer. It is unsure if microtransit can be profitable (just like public transit).

Success of microtransit systems depends on its configuration. Some experiences in the US resulted in failures.

Application 
The flexibility and intelligence in microtransit can be useful in cases when the demand is either geographically spread or coming at various and/or unpredictable times, i.e. when it is hard to gather demand with a planned transit service. Examples include: low-density areas, night services, and other formats adapted to specific needs.

Autonomous Electric Vehicle and Microtransit 
Autonomous Electric Vehicles are much more cost effective and efficient for microtransit service in comparison to other vehicle types. This cost effectiveness can be attributed to the elimination of a driver from the vehicle. A study conducted in Singapore mentioned that microtransit services using autonomous electric vehicles are capable of reducing the total cost of ownership by 70% compared to other microtransit vehicles, and by 80% compared to buses.

References

External links 
 Stromberg, J. (2015). “These startups want to do for buses what Uber did for taxi rides.” Vox.
'Shared Mobility Definitions' at Federal Transit Authority site of the US Department of Transportation
Bos, R. The rise of the Microtransit movement, smart-circle.org
Matus, J, Heck, S. Understanding The Future Of Mobility. August 8, 2015, TechCrunch
Jaffe, E. How the Microtransit Movement Is Changing Urban Mobility.  April 27, 2015. CityLab
UpRouted: Exploring Microtransit in the United States, Eno Center for Transportation, January 8, 2018 
 TCRP Research Report 188

Demand responsive transport